Patriarch Adrian (born Andrey, Андрей; 2 October 1638 – 16 October 1700) was the last pre-revolutionary Patriarch of Moscow and All Russia.

According to historian Alexander Avdeyev, the future Patriarch Adrian was born in the last days of September 1638. The years 1627, 1637 and 1639 given in the literature are incorrect. October 2, named as his birthday, is most likely the day of his baptism. Adrian's life path before being appointed Archimandrite of the Chudov Monastery remains unknown.

Already being a monk, he was known for his piety and virtues to Patriarch Joachim, who in 1678 appointed him Archimandrite of the Chudov Monastery. Managing the monastery, Archimandrite Adrian helped the adjusting of this monastery a lot. Under his supervision, a cathedral church was built in the name of St. Alexius with the Annunciation chapel, as well as a church in the name of St. Andrew the First-Called.

Adrian caught the eye of Patriarch Joachim, when he was still an archmandrite at Chudov Monastery. In 1686, Joachim appointed him metropolitan of Kazan and Sviyazhsk. On 24 August 1690, Adrian was chosen to replace Joachim on his post. Patriarch Adrian was a staunch adherent of traditional norms and opposed Peter the Great's reforms (e.g., he criticized Peter's decree on mandatory shaving of beards). Adrian's relations with the tsar were tense; however, he had to accept some of Peter's criticism about deficiencies in management of the Russian Orthodox Church.

Adrian sought to eradicate Latinizations in the Church in Ukraine. He introduced a confession requiring bishops-elect to state that the epiclesis, rather than the Words of Institution, transforms the gifts at the liturgy into the body and blood of Christ.

References

Metropolitans and Patriarchs of Moscow
1627 births
1700 deaths
17th-century Russian clergy
National University of Kyiv-Mohyla Academy alumni
Russian bishops